Malmö FF is a Swedish football team that competed in the country's Division 2 Sydsvenska Serien (South Sweden series) for the 1927–28 season.

Players

Squad stats

|}

Club

Other information

References
 

Malmö FF seasons
Malmo FF